Hortolândia is a Brazilian municipality in the interior of the state of São Paulo. It is part of the Metropolitan Region of Campinas and the Mesoregion and Microregion of Campinas. It is located northwest of the state capital, about 110 km away. It is part of the São Paulo macrometropolis, which exceeds 29 million inhabitants and makes up approximately 75 percent of the state's population. The metropolitan regions of Campinas and São Paulo form the first megalopolis in the southern hemisphere.  It is bordered by Sumaré, to the north; Monte Mor, to the south and west; and Campinas, to the east.

Hortolândia was founded in 1991, splitting from Sumaré, and the privileged location and proximity to major industrial centers in the country caused the municipality to undergo a rapid demographic and industrial development. Hortolândia is considered a technopole and there is currently representation of several companies of highly advanced technological parameter, including IBM. These activities make the city have the 76th largest nominal municipal GDP in Brazil, with BR$12.9 billion in 2017. Hortolândia has several campuses of renowned universities, such as the Federal Institute of São Paulo and the Adventist University Center of São Paulo [pt].

Some of the city's main attractions are important green areas that provide space for sports and resting. There are also the cultural projects and events held by the Municipal Secretariat of Culture, the body responsible for projecting the cultural life of Hortolândia.

History

Origins 

In 1798, lands were donated by the Portuguese Crown to José Teixeira Nogueira, an important mill owner in the region. He brought coffee for the first time to where the city of Hortolândia is today, whose work on the farms was based on slavery. After the slaves were freed, lands were donated to them, but stolen by an American doctor. Some areas were even renegotiated, but those that were made available did not favor coffee, so cotton, sugarcane and cattle breeding began to be grown. The place, which served as a stopping point for tropeiro, settlers and slaves, came to be called Jacuba (a Tupi-Guarani word meaning "hot water"), or the Sítio de Jacuba, since these travelers took advantage of the waters of the streams and the shade of the trees to rest and feed themselves.

The settlement began to take utterance when the telegraph office was inaugurated in 1896. Later, in 1917, the Jacuba telegraph post became a railroad station. Only in 1947 did its growth begin, with the approval of the Ortolândia Park subdivision, owned by João Ortolan. In December 1953, the District of Santa Cruz, which Jacuba was part of, was split from Campinas to become the municipality of Sumaré; as such, Jacuba went from a village to a district.

On April 17, 1958, Jacuba became known as Hortolândia, on the occasion of a legislative proposal by state deputy Leôncio Ferraz Júnior. The proposal to change the name came about because a district with the name "Jacuba" already existed in the state of São Paulo in the town of Iacanga (which later became part of the town of Arealva).

In the mid-1920s, an industrialization process began in Sumaré, with tax incentives. An IBM factory was installed in the Hortolândia district, on the edge of the Rodovia Jornalista Francisco Aguirre Proença. Other companies were attracted by the abundant land and tax incentives.

As a district 
The beginning of the process of turning Hortolândia into a municipality originated in 1975, although this first attempt was unsuccessful because Hortolândia did not reach 5 thousandths of the state's tax revenue and also because the President of the Republic did not give the endorsement for separation.

In the 1980s, Hortolândia was responsible for most of Sumaré's tax collection, which exceeded 60%. Popular organization followed for the pro-separation movement. The residents wanted autonomy to define the future of Hortolândia, so they began to support creation of the municipality. In 1988, with the approval of the new constitution of Brazil, the interest in becoming an autonomous district surfaced in the community leaders of Hortolândia's neighborhoods and in the population. On December 21, 1990, the Legislative Assembly of São Paulo set a plebiscite to be held in May 1991. On May 17, 1991, 97.4% voted in favor of separation in the plebiscite,.

As a city 
The municipality of Hortolândia is located in a strategic position, between major poles of development. Due to its privileged position, the region attracts large industrial organizations, besides being surrounded by large universities. The geographical location of the city is to the west of Campinas, bordering also the cities of Sumaré and Monte Mor. Hortolândia is the smallest municipality in the Campinas metropolitan area. The main river that cuts through the town is the Ribeirão Jacuba [pt]. The city has benefited economically from being along the Rodovia Anhanguera, bordering Campinas, and being close to the Viracopos International Airport. More recently, a continuation of Rodovia dos Bandeirantes was implemented through the city, in the region of Jardim Amanda. This highway allowed important access to the municipality through the cloverleaf at the junction with Rodovia Jornalista Francisco Aguirre Proença in an area near the IBM do Brasil company.

There is a visible conurbation between Campinas, Sumaré and Hortolândia, without a clear identification of the territorial limits of these municipalities. The socio-economic interdependence for these municipalities is an element of extreme importance in the elaboration of their plans and projects.

Geography

Relief and hydrography 

The soil is formed by the decomposition of eruptive rocks, with low density drainage and soils varying from red to yellow latosols, suitable for mechanised agriculture. There are also sandy soils suitable for pastures and occasional crops. In some stretches the layers are sedimentary and the sandstone substrate makes the soil more impoverished, noticeably susceptible to erosion. These characteristics are more noticeable where the terrain is more wavy.

The hydrographic basin of the Piracicaba River, the basin in which Hortolândia and the region are located, covers the southeastern part of the state of São Paulo and the extreme south of Minas Gerais and is the main source of water extraction for consumption in the Metropolitan Region of Campinas. The main river that cuts through the municipality is Ribeirão Jacuba [pt].

Climate 
The Köppen climate classification of the region is humid subtropical climate (Cwa), with decreased rainfall in winter and an average annual temperature of 21.6 °C, having dry and mild winters (rarely too cold) and rainy summers with moderately high temperatures. The warmest month, February, has an average temperature of 24.5 °C, with a maximum average of 30.1 °C and a minimum of 18.9 °C. The coldest month, July, averages 17.8 °C, with a maximum average of 25.0 °C and a minimum average of 10.7 °C. Autumn and spring are transitional seasons.

The average annual rainfall is 1384.3 mm, with August being the driest month, when only 21.0 mm occurs. In January, the rainiest month, the average is 279.6 mm. In recent years, however, hot and dry days during winter have been increasingly frequent, often exceeding the 30 °C mark, especially between July and September. In August 2010, for example, there was no rain at all in the city. Dry seasons and Indian summers in the middle of the rainy season are also common records of bush fires, especially in the rural area of the city, which contributes to deforestation and the release of pollutants into the atmosphere, further damaging the air quality.

Ecology and environment 

Most of the original vegetation that existed in the city in the Atlantic Forest was ravaged. Like 13 other municipalities of the Metropolitan Region of Campinas, the city suffers a serious environmental stress, and Hortolândia, along with Santa Bárbara d'Oeste and Sumaré, is considered one of the most critical areas subject to flooding and silting, with less than 2% of vegetation. This is the result of a historical process of land use by monocultures such as coffee and cattle breeding.

To try to reverse this situation, several projects have been and are being carried out and planned, such as the construction of wildlife corridors, despite the fact that the remaining forest fragments suffer continuously from the pressure of irregular urban settlements. There are also several environmental projects to combat the destruction of the riparian forests and an environmental protection area is being created to contain the conurbation with neighboring cities. Four environmental parks have also been created, which are natural reserves that still provide visitors and schools with environmental awareness programs.

References

External links 
  EncontraHortolândia – Find everything about Hortolândia